In mathematics,  introduced an example of an infinite-dimensional Hopf algebra, and Sweedler's Hopf algebra H4 is a certain 4-dimensional quotient of it  that is neither commutative nor cocommutative.

Definition

The Hopf algebra is generated as an algebra by three elements x, g, and g−1.

The coproduct Δ is given by 
Δ(g) = g ⊗g, Δ(x) = 1⊗x + x ⊗g

The antipode S is given by
S(x) = –x g−1, S(g) = g−1

The counit ε is given by
ε(x)=0, ε(g) = 1

Sweedler's 4-dimensional Hopf algebra H4 is the quotient of this by the relations
x2 = 0,   g2 = 1,  gx = –xg
so it has a basis 1, x, g, xg .  Note that Montgomery describes a slight variant of this Hopf algebra using the opposite coproduct, i.e. the coproduct described above composed with the tensor flip on H4⊗H4.

Sweedler's 4-dimensional Hopf algebra is a quotient of the Pareigis Hopf algebra, which is in turn a quotient of the infinite dimensional Hopf algebra.

References

Hopf algebras